Tekopua is one of 22 islands in the Aitutaki atoll of the Cook Islands. It is located on the southeastern perimeter of Aitutaki Lagoon between the smaller islands of Muritapua and Tapuaetai, seven kilometers to the southeast of the main island of Aitutaki. The island is the largest of the Aitutaki atoll, measuring 2,250 meters long and up to 480 meters wide.

References

Islands of Aitutaki